The Washington Nationals' 2008 season was the fourth season for the franchise in the District of Columbia, and the 40th since the original team was started in Montreal, Quebec, in 1969. It also marked the first season the Nationals played at Nationals Park.  The team finished in last place in the National League East with a record of 59–102, the worst record in Major League Baseball. This prompted an updated version of a running joke that originated with the American League's Senators: "Washington: First in war, first in peace, and last in the National League."

Offseason
On November 30, 2007, the Nationals traded Ryan Church and Brian Schneider to the New York Mets for Lastings Milledge. On December 3, 2007, they traded minor-leaguer Glenn Gibson to the Tampa Bay Devil Rays for Elijah Dukes, and on the following day they traded Jonathan Albaladejo to the New York Yankees for Tyler Clippard.

Advertising and marketing
The Nationals′ marketing slogan for 2008 was "Welcome Home." The slogan welcomed Nationals fans to their new "home" at Nationals Park, where the Nationals began play in 2008 after three seasons at Robert F. Kennedy Memorial Stadium.

Spring training
The Nationals held their 2008 spring training in Viera, Florida, with home games played at Space Coast Stadium.

Regular season

March

The Nationals opened the 2008 MLB season by hosting the Atlanta Braves in a nationally televised night game on March 30, 2008. It was the first professional regular-season game to be played at the Nationals' new facility Nationals Park. President George W. Bush threw the ceremonial first pitch to Nationals' manager Manny Acta, and Ryan Zimmerman hit a two-out, walk-off home run in the bottom of the ninth inning to mark an exciting beginning to the 2008 season. The Nationals also blew out the Phillies 11-6.

April
The Nationals clinched the series against the Phillies, winning 1-0. However, the Nationals struggled after a promising 3-0 start, losing 16 of their next 19 games to start off 6-16. They improved for the rest of the month, earning splits at Atlanta and at home against the Mets, and winning series against the Braves and the Pirates. Pope Benedict XVI celebrated Mass at Nationals Park in front of 47,000 people on April 17 while the Nationals were on a road trip.

May

The Nats started May winning 3 of the first 4 games of the month, earning them a 14-18 record, but lost 2 of 3 at Houston and were swept by the Florida Marlins at home. Then they took 3 of 4 against the struggling Mets at Shea Stadium, but in the first Beltway Series of 2008 they were nipped by the Orioles at Baltimore and lost two of three against the high-powered Phillies' offense. They split a series two games apiece against the Brewers and lost a series to the Padres. The Nats then beat up on the Diamondbacks in the first game of a series.

September
The team finished 59-102, the worst record in Major League Baseball. Six of the team's coaches were dismissed the day before the final game (a loss to the 2008 World Series champion Philadelphia Phillies); only manager Manny Acta and pitching coach Randy St. Clair were retained.

Season standings

Record vs. opponents

Opening Day lineup

Notable transactions 
 July 22, 2008: The Nationals traded Jon Rauch to the Arizona Diamondbacks for Emilio Bonifacio.
July 31, 2008: The Nationals traded Jhonny Núñez to the New York Yankees for Alberto González.
 August 17, 2008: The Nationals traded Luis Ayala to the New York Mets for a player to be named later. The Mets sent Anderson Hernández to the Nationals to complete the trade on August 20, 2008.

Draft
The 2008 Major League Baseball First-Year Player Draft took place on June 5 and 6. With their first pick – the ninth pick overall – the Nationals selected pitcher Aaron Crow. Other notable players the Nationals selected were shortstop Danny Espinosa (third round, 87th overall), catcher Adrián Nieto (fifth round, 151st overall), pitcher Tommy Milone (10th round, 301st overall), pitcher Louis Coleman (14th round, 421st overall), first baseman Tyler Moore (16th round, 481st overall), shortstop Steve Lombardozzi Jr. (19th round, 571st overall), pitcher Cory Mazzoni (26th round, 781st overall), pitcher Chris Heston (29th round, 871st overall), catcher Rob Brantly (46th round, 1,378th overall), and outfielder Alex Dickerson (48th round, 1,432nd overall). Crow, Coleman, Mazzoni, Heston, Brantly, and Dickerson all opted not to sign with the team. Moore finally did sign with the Nationals; it was the third time they had drafted him, but he had opted not to sign with them the first two times (in 2005 and 2006).

Roster

Attendance
The Nationals drew 2,320,400 fans at Nationals Park in 2008, placing them 13th in attendance for the season among the 16 National League teams. Boosted by the opening of Nationals Park at the beginning of the season, it was their second-best attendance total in their short history in Washington, exceeded only by the 2,731,993 they drew in 2005, their first season in Washington.

Game log

|- align="center" bgcolor="bbffbb"
| 1 || March 30 || Braves || 3–2 || Rauch (1–0) || Moylan (0–1) || || 39,389 || 1–0
|- align="center" bgcolor="bbffbb"
| 2 || March 31 || @ Phillies || 11–6  || Rivera (1–0) || Gordon (0–1)  || || 44,553 || 2–0
|-

|- align="center" bgcolor="bbffbb"
| 3 || April 2 || @ Phillies || 1–0 || Redding (1–0) || Hamels (0–1) || Rauch (1) || 44,986 || 3–0
|- align="center" bgcolor="ffbbbb"
| 4 || April 3 || @ Phillies || 8–7 (10) || Condrey (1–0) || Colomé (0–1) || || 25,831 || 3–1
|- align="center" bgcolor="ffbbbb"
| 5 || April 4 || @ Cardinals || 5–4 || Looper (1-0) || Pérez (0–1) || Isringhausen (2) || 37,191 || 3–2
|- align="center" bgcolor="ffbbbb"
| 6 || April 5 || @ Cardinals || 5–4 || Wainwright (1–0) || Chico (0–1) || Flores (1) || 41,463 || 3–3
|- align="center" bgcolor="ffbbbb" 
| 7 || April 6 || @ Cardinals || 3–0 || Lohse (1–0) || Lannan (0–1)  || Isringhausen (3) || 41,912 || 3–4
|- align="center" bgcolor="ffbbbb"
| 8 || April 7 ||  Marlins || 10–7 || Pinto (1–0) || Redding (1–1) || || 20,487 || 3–5
|- align="center" bgcolor="ffbbbb"
| 9 || April 9 ||  Marlins || 10–4 || Olsen (1–0) || Bergmann (0–1) || || 23,340 || 3–6
|- align="center" bgcolor="ffbbbb"
| 10 || April 10 ||  Marlins || 4–3 || Hendrickson (2–1) || Pérez (0–2) || Gregg (2) ||24,549 || 3–7
|- align="center" bgcolor="ffbbbb"
| 11 || April 11 || Braves || 3–0 || Hudson (2–0) || Chico (0–2) || Moylan (1) || 28,051 || 3–8
|- align="center" bgcolor="ffbbbb"
| 12 || April 12 || Braves || 10–2 || Smoltz (2–0) || Lannan (0–2) || || 32,532 || 3–9
|- align="center" bgcolor="bbffbb"
| 13 || April 13 || Braves || 5–4 || Redding (2–1) || Glavine (0–1) || Rauch (2) || 29,151 || 4–9
|- align="center" bgcolor="ffbbbb"
| 14 || April 15 || @ Mets || 6–0 || Pelfrey (2–0) || Pérez (0–3) || || 46,567 || 4–10
|- align="center" bgcolor="ffbbbb"
| 15 || April 16 || @ Mets || 5–2 || Maine (1–1) || Chico (0–3) || Wagner (2) || 46,106  || 4–11
|- align="center" bgcolor="ffbbbb"
| 16 || April 17 || @ Mets || 3–2 (14) || Sosa (2–1) || Hanrahan (0–1) || || 47,785 || 4–12
|- align="center" bgcolor="bbffbb"
| 17 || April 18 || @ Marlins || 6–4 || Redding (3–1) || J. Miller (1–1) || Rauch (3) || 13,279 || 5–12
|- align="center" bgcolor="ffbbbb"
| 18 || April 19 || @ Marlins || 6–5 || Gregg (2–0) || Rivera (1–1) || || 18,944 || 5–13
|- align="center" bgcolor="ffbbbb"
| 19 || April 20 || @ Marlins || 6–1 || Olsen (3–0) || Ayala (0–1) || || 11,635 || 5–14
|- align="center" bgcolor="ffbbbb"
| 20 || April 21 || @ Braves || 7–3 || Hudson (3–1) || Chico (0–4) || || 16,706 || 5–15
|- align="center" bgcolor="bbffbb"
| 21 || April 22 || @ Braves || 6–0 || Lannan (1–2) || Smoltz (3–1) || || 23,482 || 6–15
|- align="center" bgcolor="ffbbbb"
| 22 || April 23 || Mets || 7–2 || Santana (3–2) || Redding (3–2) || || 32,780 || 6–16
|- align="center" bgcolor="bbffbb"
| 23 || April 24 || Mets || 10–5 || O'Connor (1–0) || Pérez (2–1) || || 29,750 || 7–16
|- align="center" bgcolor="bbffbb"
| 24 || April 25 || Cubs || 5–3 || Rauch (2–0) || Howry (0–1) ||  || 35,154 || 8–16
|- align="center" bgcolor="ffbbbb"
| 25 || April 26 || Cubs || 7–0 || Zambrano (4–1) || Chico (0–5) || || 35,188 || 8–17
|- align="center" bgcolor="bbffbb"
| 26 || April 27 || Cubs || 2–0 || Lannan (2–2) || Lilly (1–4) || Rauch (4) || 33,795 || 9–17
|- align="center" bgcolor="bbffbb"
| 27 || April 29 || Braves || 6–3 || Rivera (2–1) || Boyer (0–3) || Rauch (5) || 25,285 || 10–17
|- align="center" bgcolor="bbffbb"
| 28 || April 30 || Braves || 3–2 (12) || Rivera (3–1) || Acosta (0–1) ||  || 29,473 || 11–17
|-

|- align="center" bgcolor="bbffbb"
| 29 || May 1 || Pirates || 3–2 || Ayala (1–1) || Grabow (1–1) || Rauch (6) || 24,723 || 12–17
|- align="center" bgcolor="ffbbbb"
| 30 || May 2 || Pirates || 11–4 || Marte (2–0) || Lannan (2–3) || || 26,001 || 12–18
|- align="center" bgcolor="bbffbb"
| 31 || May 3 || Pirates || 9–8 || Colomé (1–1) || Maholm (2–3) || Rauch (7) || 34,128 || 13–18
|- align="center" bgcolor="bbffbb"
| 32 || May 4 || Pirates || 5–2 || Redding (4–2) || Snell (2–2) || || 30,564 || 14–18
|- align="center" bgcolor="ffbbbb"
| 33 || May 6 || @ Astros || 6–5 || Brocail (2–0) || Ayala (1–2) || Valverde (7) || 30,335 || 14–19
|- align="center" bgcolor="ffbbbb"
| 34 || May 7 || @ Astros || 4–3 || Valverde (4–1) || Hanrahan (0–2) || || 30,432 || 14–20
|- align="center" bgcolor="bbffbb"
| 35 || May 8 || @ Astros || 8–3 || Lannan (3–3) || Backe (2–4) || || 33,433 || 15–20
|- align="center" bgcolor="ffbbbb"
| 36 || May 9 || Marlins || 7–3 || Nolasco (2–3) || Redding (4–3)|| || 23,379 || 15–21
|- align="center" bgcolor="ffbbbb"
| 37 || May 10 || Marlins || 11–0 || A. Miller (3–2) || O'Connor (1–1) || || 28,663 || 15–22
|- align="center" bgcolor="ffbbbb"
| 38 || May 11 || Marlins || 5–4 || Kensing (2–0) || Ayala (1–3) || Gregg (7) || 25,871 || 15–23
|- align="center" bgcolor="bbffbb"
| 39 || May 12 || @ Mets || 10–4 || Pérez (1–3) || Figueroa (2–3) || || 45,321 || 16–23
|- align="center" bgcolor="ffbbbb"
| 40 || May 13 || @ Mets || 6–3 || Maine (5–2) || Lannan (3–4) || Wagner (8) || 46,618 || 16–24
|- align="center" bgcolor="bbffbb"
| 41 || May 14 || @ Mets || 5–3 || Redding (5–3) || Vargas (0–1) || Rauch (8) || 48,529 || 17–24
|- align="center" bgcolor="bbffbb"
| 42 || May 15 || @ Mets || 1–0 || Bergmann (1–1) || Pelfrey (2–4) || Rauch (9) || 51,769 || 18–24
|- align="center" bgcolor="ffbbbb"
| 43 || May 16 || @ Orioles || 5–3 || Olson (3–0) || Hill (0–1) || Sherrill (16) || 29,266 || 18–25
|- align="center" bgcolor="ffbbbb"
| 44 || May 17 || @ Orioles || 6–5 || Burres (4–4) || Pérez (1–4) || Sherrill (17) || 32,662 || 18–26
|- align="center" bgcolor="bbffbb"
| 45 || May 18 || @ Orioles || 2–1 || Lannan (4–4) || Guthrie (2–4) || Rauch (10) || 33,745 || 19–26
|- align="center" bgcolor="bbffbb"
| 46 || May 19 || Phillies || 4–0 || Redding (6–3) || Myers (2–5) || || 25,394 || 20–26
|- align="center" bgcolor="ffbbbb"
| 47 || May 20 || Phillies || 1–0 || Gordon (4–2) || Rauch (2–1) || Lidge (11) || 28,105 || 20–27
|- align="center" bgcolor="ffbbbb"
| 48 || May 21 || Phillies || 12–2 || Moyer (4–3) || Chico (0–6) || || 28,055 || 20–28
|- align="center" bgcolor="bbffbb"
| 49 || May 23 || Brewers || 5–1 || Sanches (1–0) || Suppan (2–4) || || 28,007 || 21–28
|- align="center" bgcolor="ffbbbb"
| 50 || May 24 || Brewers || 5–2 || McClung (2–1) || Lannan (4–5) || Torres (2) || 30,029 || 21–29
|- align="center" bgcolor="bbffbb"
| 51 || May 25 || Brewers || 7–6 || Rauch (3–1) || Mota (1–3) || || 35,567 || 22–29
|- align="center" bgcolor="ffbbbb"
| 52 || May 26 || Brewers || 4–3 (11) || Villanueva (3–5) || Rivera (3–2) || Torres (3) || 28,552 || 22–30
|- align="center" bgcolor="ffbbbb"
| 53 || May 27 || @ Padres || 4–2 || Bell (1–3) || Manning (0–1) || Hoffman (10) || 18,744 || 22–31
|- align="center" bgcolor="bbffbb"
| 54 || May 28 || @ Padres || 6–4 || Pérez (2–4) || Estes (1–1) || Rauch (11) || 19,201 || 23–31
|- align="center" bgcolor="ffbbbb"
| 55 || May 29 || @ Padres || 5–2 || Bell (2–3) || Rivera (3–3) || Hoffman (11) || 25,021 || 23–32
|- align="center" bgcolor="bbffbb"
| 56 || May 30 || @ D-backs || 7–4 || Hanrahan (1–0) || Owings (6–3) || Rauch (12)|| 25,391 || 24–32
|- align="center" bgcolor="ffbbbb"
| 57 || May 31 || @ D-backs || 4–0 || Webb (10–2) || Bergmann (1–2) || || 38,507 || 24–33
|-

|- align="center" bgcolor="ffbbbb"
| 58 || June 1 || @ D-backs || 5–0 || Haren (6–4) || Hill (0–2)|| || 28,249 || 24–34
|- align="center" bgcolor="ffbbbb"
| 59 || June 3 || Cardinals || 6–1 || Lohse (6–2) || Pérez (2–5) || || 26,875 || 24–35
|- align="center" bgcolor="bbbbbb"
| — || June 4 || Cardinals || colspan=6| Postponed (rain) Rescheduled for June 5 as part of a doubleheader
|- align="center" bgcolor="ffbbbb"
| 60 || June 5 (1) || Cardinals || 4–1 || Wellemeyer (7–1) || Lannan (4–6) || Franklin (7) || 27,264 || 24–36
|- align="center" bgcolor="bbffbb"
| 61 || June 5 (2) || Cardinals || 10–9 (10) || Sanches (2–0) || Franklin (2–2) || || 32,357 || 25–36
|- align="center" bgcolor="ffbbbb"
| 62 || June 6 || Giants || 10–1 || Lincecum (8–1) || Bergmann (1–3) || || 25,987 || 25–37
|- align="center" bgcolor="ffbbbb"
| 63 || June 7 || Giants || 6–0 || Sánchez (5–3) || Hill (0–3) || || 30,652 || 25–38
|- align="center" bgcolor="ffbbbb"
| 64 || June 8 || Giants || 6–3 || Zito (2–9) || Mock (0–1) || Wilson (17) || 30,224 || 25–39
|- align="center" bgcolor="ffbbbb"
| 65 || June 9 || Giants || 3–2 || Cain (3–4) || Clippard (0–1) || Wilson (18) || 26,209 || 25–40
|- align="center" bgcolor="bbffbb"
| 66 || June 10 || @ Pirates || 7–6 || Hanrahan (2–2) || Capps (0–1) || Rauch (13) || 12,957 || 26–40
|- align="center" bgcolor="ffbbbb"
| 67 || June 11 || @ Pirates || 3–1 || Snell (3–6) || Lannan (4–7) || Capps (16) || 15,439 || 26–41
|- align="center" bgcolor="ffbbbb"
| 68 || June 12 || @ Pirates || 7–5 || Gorzelanny (5–5) || Bergmann (1–4) || Marte (1) || 16,306 || 26–42
|- align="center" bgcolor="bbffbb"
| 69 || June 13 || @ Mariners || 7–6 || Hill (1–3) || Dickey (1–2) || Rauch (14) || 35,941 || 27–42
|- align="center" bgcolor="bbffbb"
| 70 || June 14 || @ Mariners || 5–2 || Clippard (1–1) || Batista (3–8) || Rauch (15) || 32,145 || 28–42
|- align="center" bgcolor="bbffbb"
| 71 || June 15 || @ Mariners || 6–2 || Colomé (2–1) || Lowe (1–3) || || 38,548 || 29–42
|- align="center" bgcolor="ffbbbb"
| 72 || June 17 || @ Twins || 2–1 ||Hernández (7–4) || Lannan (4–8) || Nathan (18) || 20,920 || 29–43
|- align="center" bgcolor="ffbbbb"
| 73 || June 18 || @ Twins || 11–2 || Slowey (4–6) || Bergmann (1–5) || || 23,841 || 29–44
|- align="center" bgcolor="ffbbbb"
| 74 || June 19 || @ Twins || 9–3 || Perkins (3–2) || Hill (1–4) || || 24,793 || 29–45
|- align="center" bgcolor="bbffbb"
| 75 || June 20 || Rangers || 4–3 (14) || Hanrahan (3–2) || Wright (4–3) || || 30,359 || 30–45
|- align="center" bgcolor="ffbbbb"
| 76 || June 21 || Rangers || 13–3 || Gabbard (2–3) || Mock (0–2) || Mendoza (1) || 32,975 || 30–46
|- align="center" bgcolor="ffbbbb"
| 77 || June 22 || Rangers || 5–3 || Padilla (10–3) || Ayala (1–4) || Wilson (15) || 32,690 || 30–47
|- align="center" bgcolor="ffbbbb"
| 78 || June 23 || Angels || 3–2 || Lackey (5–1) || Rivera (3–4) || Rodríguez (31) || 24,805 || 30–48
|- align="center" bgcolor="ffbbbb"
| 79 || June 24 || Angels || 8–3 || Garland (7–4) || Hill (1–5) || || 28,531 || 30–49
|- align="center" bgcolor="bbffbb"
| 80 || June 25 || Angels || 5–4 || Rauch (4–1) || Shields (3–2) || || 29,180 || 31–49
|- align="center" bgcolor="bbffbb"
| 81 || June 27 || Orioles || 4–2 || Hanrahan (4–2) || Cabrera (5–4) || Rauch (16) || 35,830 || 32–49
|- align="center" bgcolor="ffbbbb"
| 82 || June 28 || Orioles || 9–1 || Olson (6–3) || Lannan (4–9) || Cormier (1) || 39,479 || 32–50
|- align="center" bgcolor="bbffbb"
| 83 || June 29 || Orioles || 3–2 (12) || Hanrahan (5–2) || Sherrill (2–3) || || 39,824 || 33–50
|- align="center" bgcolor="ffbbbb"
| 84 || June 30 || @ Marlins || 6–5 (10) || Gregg (6–2) ||  Rauch (4–2) || || 10,888 || 33–51
|-

|- align="center" bgcolor="bbffbb"
| 85 || July 1 || @ Marlins || 9–6 || Balester (1–0) || Hendrickson (7–7) || || 12,166 || 34–51
|- align="center" bgcolor="ffbbbb"
| 86 || July 2 || @ Marlins || 4–2 || Nolasco (9–4) || Manning (0–2) || || 23,624 || 34–52
|- align="center" bgcolor="ffbbbb"
| 87 || July 3 || @ Reds || 5–3 || Cueto (7–8) || Colomé (2–2) || Cordero (16)|| 23,259 || 34–53
|- align="center" bgcolor="ffbbbb"
| 88 || July 4 || @ Reds || 3–0 || Arroyo (6–7) || Bergmann (1–6) || Cordero (17) || 22,626 || 34–54
|- align="center" bgcolor="ffbbbb"
| 89 || July 5 || @ Reds || 3–2 || Cordero (4–1) || Hanrahan (5–3) || || 37,121 || 34–55
|- align="center" bgcolor="ffbbbb"
| 90 || July 6 || @ Reds || 6–5 || Vólquez (11–3) || Balester (1–1) || Cordero (18) || 28,814 || 34–56
|- align="center" bgcolor="ffbbbb"
| 91 || July 8 || D-backs || 2–0 || Webb (13–4) || Pérez (2–6) || Lyon (19) || 26,820 || 34–57
|- align="center" bgcolor="bbffbb"
| 92 || July 9 || D-backs || 5–0 || Lannan (5–9) || Owings (6–8) || || 25,862 || 35–57
|- align="center" bgcolor="ffbbbb"
| 93 || July 10 || D-backs || 7–5 (11) || Qualls (2–6) || Ayala (1–5) || || 27,330 || 35–58
|- align="center" bgcolor="bbffbb"
| 94 || July 11 || Astros || 10–0 || Redding (7–3) || Paronto (0–1) || Shell (1) || 33,653 || 36–58
|- align="center" bgcolor="ffbbbb"
| 95 || July 12 || Astros || 6–4 || Rodríguez (4–3) || Balester (1–2) || Valverde (24) || 30,682 || 36–59
|- align="center" bgcolor="ffbbbb"
| 96 || July 13 || Astros || 5–0 || Backe (6–9) || Pérez (2–7) || || 31,463 || 36–60
|- style="text-align:center; background:#bbb;"
|colspan=9| All–Star Break (July 14–16)
|- align="center" bgcolor="ffbbbb"
| 97 || July 18 || @ Braves || 7–6 || Hudson (10–7) || Redding (7–4) || González (4) || 39,861 || 36–61
|- align="center" bgcolor="bbffbb"
| 98 || July 19 || @ Braves || 8–2 || Lannan (6–9) || Jurrjens (9–5) || || 43,285 || 37–61
|- align="center" bgcolor="bbffbb"
| 99 || July 20 || @ Braves || 15–6 || Pérez (3–7) || Reyes (3–9) || || 29,320 || 38–61
|- align="center" bgcolor="ffbbbb"
| 100 || July 22 || @ Giants || 6–3 || Zito (5–12) || Bergmann (1–7) || Wilson (26) || 34,813 || 38–62
|- align="center" bgcolor="ffbbbb"
| 101 || July 23 || @ Giants || 6–4 || Espineli (1–0) || Ayala (1–6) || Wilson (27) || 35,539 || 38–63
|- align="center" bgcolor="ffbbbb"
| 102 || July 24 || @ Giants || 1–0 || Cain (6–8) || Redding (7–5) || || 36,963 || 38–64
|- align="center" bgcolor="ffbbbb"
| 103 || July 25 || @ Dodgers || 3–2 || Billingsley (10–9) || Lannan (6–10) || Broxton (3) || 47,313 || 38–65
|- align="center" bgcolor="ffbbbb"
| 104 || July 26 || @ Dodgers || 6–0 || Lowe (8–8) || Pérez (3–8) || || 42,122 || 38–66
|- align="center" bgcolor="ffbbbb"
| 105 || July 27 || @ Dodgers || 2–0 || Kershaw (1–3) || Bergmann (1–8) || Broxton (4) || 38,660 || 38–67
|- align="center" bgcolor="ffbbbb"
| 106 || July 29 || Phillies || 2–1 || Myers (4–9) || Balester (1–3) || Lidge (25) || 34,039 || 38–68
|- align="center" bgcolor="ffbbbb"
| 107 || July 30 || Phillies || 8–5 || Moyer (10–6) || Redding (7–6) || Lidge (26) || 31,798 || 38–69
|- align="center" bgcolor="ffbbbb"
| 108 || July 31 || Phillies || 8–4 || Kendrick (9–5) || Lannan (6–11) || || 31,658 || 38–70
|-

|- align="center" bgcolor="bbffbb"
| 109 || August 1 || Reds || 5–2 || Pérez (4–8) || Bailey (0–5) || || 30,572 || 39–70
|- align="center" bgcolor="bbffbb"
| 110 || August 2 || Reds || 10–6 || Manning (1–2) || Lincoln (1–3) || || 30,970 || 40–70
|- align="center" bgcolor="bbffbb"
| 111 || August 3 || Reds || 4–2 || Balester (2–3) || Cueto (7–11) || Hanrahan (1) || 32,939 || 41–70
|- align="center" bgcolor="bbffbb"
| 112 || August 4 || @ Rockies || 9–4 || Redding (8–6) || Cook (14–7) || || 33,143 || 42–70
|- align="center" bgcolor="ffbbbb"
| 113 || August 5 || @ Rockies || 8–2 || Corpas (2–3) || Ayala (1–7) || || 27,483 || 42–71
|- align="center" bgcolor="bbbbbb"
| — || August 6 || @ Rockies || colspan=6| Postponed (rain) Rescheduled for August 7 as part of a doubleheader
|- align="center" bgcolor="bbffbb"
| 114 || August 7 (1) || @ Rockies || 6–3 || Bergmann (2–8) || Francis (3–8) || Hanrahan (2) || 30,448 || 43–71
|- align="center" bgcolor="bbffbb"
| 115 || August 7 (2) || @ Rockies || 6–3 || Pérez (5–8) || Jiménez (8–10) || Hanrahan (3) || 30,448 || 44–71
|- align="center" bgcolor="ffbbbb"
| 116 || August 8 || @ Brewers || 5–0 || Sabathia (6–0) || Balester (2–4) || || 43,209 || 44–72
|- align="center" bgcolor="ffbbbb"
| 117 || August 9 || @ Brewers || 6–0 || Sheets (11–5) || Redding (8–7) || || 42,974 || 44–73
|- align="center" bgcolor="ffbbbb"
| 118 || August 10 || @ Brewers || 5–4 || Mota (3–5) (13) || Ayala (1–8) || || 42,423 || 44–74
|- align="center" bgcolor="ffbbbb"
| 119 || August 11 || @ Brewers || 7–1 || Bush (7–9) || Mock (0–3) || || 42,196 || 44–75
|- align="center" bgcolor="ffbbbb"
| 120 || August 12 || Mets || 4–3 || Santana (10–7) || Rivera (3–5) || Feliciano (1) || 32,186 || 44–76
|- align="center" bgcolor="ffbbbb"
| 121 || August 13 || Mets || 12–0 || Maine (10–7) || Bergmann (2–9) || Stokes (1) || 30,814 || 44–77
|- align="center" bgcolor="ffbbbb"
| 122 || August 14 || Mets || 9–3 || Pérez (9–7) || Balester (2–5) || || 31,058 || 44–78
|- align="center" bgcolor="ffbbbb"
| 123 || August 15 || Rockies || 4–3 || de la Rosa (6–6) || Redding (8–8) || Fuentes (23) || 27,965 || 44–79
|- align="center" bgcolor="ffbbbb"
| 124 || August 16 || Rockies || 13–6 || Hernández (1–1) || Lannan (6–12) || || 28,909 || 44–80
|- align="center" bgcolor="ffbbbb"
| 125 || August 17 || Rockies || 7–2 || Cook (15–8) || Pérez (5–9) || || 31,467 || 44–81
|- align="center" bgcolor="ffbbbb"
| 126 || August 19 || @ Phillies || 5 – 4 || Madson (3-1) || Shell (0-1) || Lidge (31) || 44,143 || 44-82
|- align="center" bgcolor="ffbbbb"
| 127 || August 20 || @ Phillies || 4 – 0 || Myers (6-10) || Balester (2-6) || || 45,166 || 44-83
|- align="center" bgcolor="bbffbb"
| 128 || August 21 || @ Phillies || 4-3 || Rivera (4-5) || Madson (3-2) || Hanrahan (4) || 41,568 || 45-83
|- align="center" bgcolor="bbffbb"
| 129 || August 22 || @ Cubs || 13-5 || Lannan (7-12) || Cotts (0-2) || || 40,513 || 46-83
|- align="center" bgcolor="ffbbbb"
| 130 || August 23 || @ Cubs || 9-2 || Dempster (15-5) || Pérez (5-10) || || 40,708 || 46-84
|- align="center" bgcolor="ffbbbb"
| 131 || August 24 || @ Cubs || 6-1  || Harden (9-2) || Bergmann (2-10) || || 40,682 || 46-85
|- align="center" bgcolor="bbffbb"
| 132 || August 26 || Dodgers || 2-1 || Balester (3-6) || Derek Lowe || Hanrahan (5) || 26,110 || 47-85
|- align="center" bgcolor="bbffbb"
| 133 || August 27 || Dodgers || 5-4 || Redding (9-8) || Maddux (6-11) || Hanrahan (6) || 22,907 || 48-85
|- align="center" bgcolor="bbffbb"
| 134 || August 28 || Dodgers || 11-2 || Lannan (8-12) || Kershaw (2-5) || || 26,338 || 49-85
|- align="center" bgcolor="bbffbb"
| 135 || August 29 || Braves || 7-3 || Pérez (6-10) || Campillo || Hanrahan || 22,737 || 50-85
|- align="center" bgcolor="bbffbb"
| 136 || August 30 || Braves || 9-8 || Shell (1-1) || V. Núñez (0-2) || || 30,326 || 51-85
|- align="center" bgcolor="bbffbb"
| 137 || August 31 || Braves || 8-4 || Mock (1-3) || Elmer Dessens (0-1) || || 31,090 || 52-85
|-

|- align="center" bgcolor="bbffbb"
| 138 || September 1 || Phillies || 7–4 || Redding (10–8) || Kendrick (11–8) || || 28,393 || 53–85
|- align="center" bgcolor="ffbbbb"
| 139 || September 2 || Phillies || 4–0 || Hamels (12–8) || Lannan (8–13) || || 23,150 || 53–86
|- align="center" bgcolor="bbffbb"
| 140 || September 3 || Phillies || 9–7 || Rivera (5–5) || C. Durbin (5–4) || || 23,122 || 54–86
|- align="center" bgcolor="ffbbbb"
| 141 || September 4 || @ Braves || 2-0 || Parr (1–0) || Martis (0–1) || Gonzalez (9) || 18,708 || 54–87
|- align="center" bgcolor="ffbbbb"
| 142 || September 5 || @ Braves || 10-5 || Jurrjens (12–9) || Bergmann (2–11) || || 25,064 || 54–88
|- align="center" bgcolor="bbffbb"
| 143 || September 6 || @ Braves || 8-5 (10) || Hanrahan (6–3) || Gonzalez (0–2) || Shell (2) || 34,369 || 55–88
|- align="center" bgcolor="bbffbb"
| 144 || September 7 || @ Braves || 7-4 (14) || Shell (2–1) || Bennett (2–6) || Hanrahan (8) || 30,753 || 56–88
|- align="center" bgcolor="ffbbbb"
| 145 || September 9 || @ Mets || 10–8 || Smith (4–3)  || Manning (1–3) || Ayala (6) || 50,382 || 56–89
|- align="center" bgcolor="ffbbbb"
| 146 || September 10 || @ Mets || 13–10 || Smith (5–3)  || Rivera (5–6) || Ayala (7)  || 52,431 || 56–90
|- align="center" bgcolor="ffbbbb"
| 147 || September 12 || @ Marlins || 2 – 1 || Olsen (7-10) || Martis (0-2) || Lindstrom (3) || 12,121 || 56–91
|- align="center" bgcolor="ffbbbb"
| 148 || September 13 || @ Marlins || 4 – 2 || Johnson (5-1) || Redding (10-9) || Lindstrom (4) || 16,307 || 56–92
|- align="center" bgcolor="ffbbbb"
| 149 || September 14 || @ Marlins || 8 – 7 || A. Miller (6-9) || Shell (2-2) || Rhodes (2) || 12,024 || 56–93
|- align="center" bgcolor="bbffbb"
| 150 || September 15 || Mets || 7–2 || Lannan (9–13) || P. Martínez (5–5) || || 21,759 || 57–93
|- align="center" bgcolor="bbffbb"
| 151 || September 16 || Mets || 1–0 || Pérez (7–10) || Pelfrey (13–10) || Hanrahan (9) || 24,997 || 58–93
|- align="center" bgcolor="ffbbbb"
| 152 || September 17 || Mets || 9–7 || Knight (1–0) || Martis (0–3) || Ayala (8) || 25,019 || 58–94
|- align="center" bgcolor="ffbbbb"
| 153 || September 18 || Mets || 7–2 || Santana (14–7) || Redding (10–10)  || || 25,426 || 58–95
|- align="center" bgcolor="ffbbbb"
| 154 || September 19 || Padres || 11-6(14) || Hampson (2-1) || Speigner (0-1) || || 28,600 || 58-96
|- align="center" bgcolor="ffbbbb"
| 155 || September 20 || Padres || 6-1 || Young (6-6) || Lannan (9-14) || || 27,474 || 58-97
|- align="center" bgcolor="ffbbbb"
| 156 || September 21 || Padres || 6-2 || Baek (6-10) ||Pérez (7-11) || || 29,608 || 58-98
|- align="center" bgcolor="bbffbb"
| 157 || September 23 || Marlins || 9 – 4 || Martis (1-3) || Olsen (8-11) || || 20,657 || 59–98
|- align="center" bgcolor="ffbbbb"
| 158 || September 24 || Marlins || 9 – 4 || Johnson (7-1) || Redding (10-11) || || 23,299 || 59–99
|- align="center" bgcolor="bbbbbb"
| -- || September 25 || Marlins || colspan=6|Cancelled (rain) No make-up game was scheduled
|- align="center" bgcolor="ffbbbb"
| 159 || September 26 || @ Phillies || 8–4 || Blanton (9–12) || Balester (3–7) || || 44,145 || 59–100
|- align="center" bgcolor="ffbbbb"
| 160 || September 27 || @ Phillies || 4–3 || Moyer (16–7) || Lannan (9–15) || Lidge (41) || 45,177 || 59–101
|- align="center" bgcolor="ffbbbb"
| 161 || September 28 || @ Phillies || 8–3 || Walrond (1–1) || Pérez (7–12) || || 44,945 || 59–102
|-

Player stats

Batting

Note: Pos = Position; G = Games played; AB = At bats; R = Runs scored; H = Hits; 2B = Doubles; 3B = Triples; HR = Home runs; RBI = Runs batted in; AVG = Batting average; SB = Stolen bases

Pitching

Table is sortable.

Note: Pos = Position; W = Wins; L = Losses; ERA = Earned run average; G = Games pitched; GS = Games started; SV = Saves; IP = Innings pitched; R = Runs allowed; ER = Earned runs allowed; BB = Walks allowed; K = Strikeouts

Team leaders

Qualifying players only.

Batting

Pitching

Awards and honors

All-Stars
 Cristian Guzmán, SS

Washington's Top 20 Prospects
1. Chris Marrero, 1B/OF 
2. Ross Detwiler, LHP 
3. Collin Balester, RHP  
4. Michael Burgess, OF  
5. Jack McGeary, LHP  
6. Josh Smoker, LHP  
7. Jordan Zimmermann, RHP  
8. Justin Maxwell, OF  
9. Colton Willems, RHP  
10. John Lannan, LHP 
11. Jake Smolinski, OF  
12. Tyler Clippard, RHP  
13. Adam Carr, RHP  
14. Ian Desmond, SS  
15. Garrett Mock, RHP  
16. Stephen King, SS  
17. Esmailyn Gonzalez, SS  
18. Shairon Martis, RHP  
19. Brad Peacock, RHP  
20. Kory Casto, OF/3B

Farm system

LEAGUE CHAMPIONS: Potomac

References

2008 Washington Nationals season at Baseball Reference

Washington Nationals
Washington Nationals seasons
Wash